Tyrrhenian may refer to the:

 Tyrrhenian Stage, a faunal stage from 0.26 to 0.01143 million years ago
 Tyrrhenians, an ancient ethnonym associated with the Etruscans
 Tyrrhenian Sea
 Tyrrhenian Basin
 Tyrrhenian languages

See also

 
 Tyrrhenia (disambiguation)
 Etruscan (disambiguation) aka Tyrrhenian
 Etrurian (disambiguation) aka Tyrrhenian
 Tyrsenian (disambiguation) aka Tyrrhenian